Luke  Ross (born Luciano Queiroz 18 July 1972) is a comic artist known for his work on books such as Gen13, Spider-Man, Green Lantern, Indiana Jones and Captain America.

References

External links

Brazilian comics artists
1972 births
Living people